Polysubstance use refers to the use of combinations of psychoactive substances with both legal and illegal substances. This page lists polysubstance combinations used entheogenic, or recreational, or off-label indicated use of pharmaceuticals; For example, the over-the-counter motion sickness combination drug dimenhydrinate (8-chlorotheophylline/diphenhydramine) is occasially used in higher doses as a deliriant. The prescription medicine Adderall (dextroamphetamine sulfate/amphetamine sulfate/dextroamphetamine saccharate/amphetamine aspartate monohydrate) is also frequently used recreationally.

See also
List of plants used for smoking

References

External links 

Combination drugs

Drug culture